is a Japanese voice actress affiliated with Mausu Promotion.

Biography

Filmography

Television animation
 2008
 Nijū Mensō no Musume as Spectator A (ep 5)

 2009
 Umineko: When They Cry as Belphegor
 Tatakau Shisho as Ia Mira

 2010
 Princess Jellyfish as Lina
 HeartCatch PreCure! as Toshiko Sakuma

 2011
 I Don't Like You at All, Big Brother!! as Girl (ep 10)
 Naruto: Shippuden as Headman's Granddaughter (ep 195)
 Baka and Test: Summon the Beasts as 3rd grade girl A (ep 11)
 Blood-C as Woman (ep 5)
 Blade as Yati (ep 6)
 Manyū Hiken-chō as Kayo (ep 3)
 Puella Magi Madoka Magica as Kyōsuke Kamijō
 Level E as Announcer (ep 1); Demon King (ep 7); Robert's Wife (ep 11); Saki's Friend A (eps 8–9); Younger Brother (ep 4)

 2012
 Another as Mizuno
 JoJo's Bizarre Adventure as Reporter (ep 11)
 Fate/Zero as Child (ep 19)
 Naruto: Shippuden as Ruka

 2013
 Amnesia as Rika

 2014
 Magic Kaito

 2015
 The Testament of Sister New Devil as Zest

Theatrical animation 
 2008
 The Garden of Sinners: The Hollow Shrine as Nurse B
 The Garden of Sinners: Paradox Spiral as Newscaster

 2012
 Puella Magi Madoka Magica Part 1: Beginnings as Kyōsuke Kamijō
 Puella Magi Madoka Magica Part 2: Eternal as Kyōsuke Kamijō

 2013
 Puella Magi Madoka Magica New Feature: Rebellion as Kyōsuke Kamijō

ONA 
 2015
 Toki wa Meguru: Tokyo Station as Misaki

 2022
 Tekken: Bloodline as Julia Chang

OVA 
 2012
 Kissxsis OVA as Health Committee Member (ep 7)

 2018
 The Testament of Sister New Devil DEPARTURES as Zest

Video games
 1999
 Grand Theft Auto 2 Funami FM DJ as Teriyaki-chan
 2008
 Cooking Mama: World Kitchen as David and Clara
 2010
 Corpse Party as Tohko Kirisaki
 2012
 Street Fighter X Tekken as Julia Chang
 Fire Emblem Awakening as Sayri and Noire

2015
Criminal Girls 2: Party Favors as Tsukasa

2016
Street Fighter V as Eliza
The King of Fighters XIV as Leona Heidern

2017
100% Orange Juice as Suguri

2018
The King of Fighters All Star as Leona Heidern
SNK Heroines: Tag Team Frenzy as Leona Heidern
Soulcalibur VI
Azur Lane as Japanese aircraft carrier Jun'yo 

2020
Shinobi Master Senran Kagura: New Link as Leona Heidern

2022
The King of Fighters XV as Leona Heidern
Azur Lane as Junyou META

Vomics
 Kekkai Sensen as Chain Sumeragi

Dubbing
 Piranha 3DD as Maddy (Danielle Panabaker)

References

External links 
 

1986 births
Living people
Japanese video game actresses
Japanese voice actresses
Mausu Promotion voice actors
People from Niigata (city)
Voice actresses from Niigata Prefecture
21st-century Japanese actresses